Lupșa is a commune in Alba County, Romania.

Lupșa may also refer to the following places in Romania:

 Lupșanu, a commune in Călărași County
 Lupșa, a village in Hoghiz Commune, Brașov County
 Lupșa de Jos and Lupșa de Sus, villages in Broșteni, Mehedinți County
 Lupșeni, a village in Galda de Jos Commune, Alba County
 Lupșa, a tributary of the Arieș in Alba County
 Lupșa (Olt), a tributary of the Olt in Brașov County

See also 
 Lupu (disambiguation)
 Lupești (disambiguation)
 Lupoaia (disambiguation)